Népliget or People's Park is the biggest public park in Budapest, Hungary. It was established to commemorate the 100th anniversary of the union of Pest, Buda and Óbuda. The park is the site of the Planetarium, which is a laser theatre, and the E-klub, the biggest night club in Budapest.

Circuit

The park was the site of the 1936 Hungarian Grand Prix, held on roads within the park, as well as a round of the 1963 European Touring Car Challenge season. The circuit hosted European Touring Car Championship races in 1963–1964, 1966–1967, and 1969–1970. The Hungarian Grand Prix was also scheduled for 7 October 1984 but was cancelled and replaced by the European Grand Prix at the Nürburgring.

Lap records 

The official fastest race lap records at the Népliget Park are listed as:

Transport

South of the park is the Népliget bus station, an international coach station. The Line 3 (North–south line) of the Budapest Metro has a stop there. The tram #1-#1A have three stops along the north-western border of the Népliget.

References

Parks in Budapest
Defunct motorsport venues
Motorsport venues in Hungary